The 2017 Cleveland mayoral election took place on November 7, 2017, to elect the Mayor of Cleveland, Ohio. The election was officially nonpartisan, with the top two candidates from the September 12 primary election advancing to the general election, regardless of party. Incumbent Democratic Mayor Frank G. Jackson won reelection to a fourth term.

Primary election

Candidates

On ballot
 Eric J. Brewer, former Mayor of East Cleveland (Democrat)
 Brandon Chrostowski, CEO of Edwins Leadership and Restaurant Institute
 Frank G. Jackson, incumbent Mayor of Cleveland (Democrat)
 Jeff Johnson, Cleveland City Council member and former state Senator (Democrat)
 Robert M. Kilo, Former State Director of the Fellowship of Christian Athletes, former Director of Advocacy/Government and Community Relations for Friends of Breakthrough Schools (Republican)
 Tony Madalone, CEO of Fresh Brewed Tees (Republican)
 Bill Patmon, State Representative and former Cleveland City Council member (Democrat)
 Zack Reed, Cleveland City Council member (Democrat)
 Dyrone W. Smith

Write-in candidates
 James Jerome Bell
 Camry S. Kincaid

Disqualified
 Brian S. Costa
 Kevin Cronin
 Angela Y. Davis
 Barbara A. DeBerry
 Laverne Jones-Gore, perennial candidate
 Marcus Henley
 Velimir Lucic, local business owner
 Robert Owens
 Ricky L. Pittman, perennial candidate
 Renee Saunders
Landry M. Simmons, Jr.
 Flint J. Williams, Jr.

Withdrew
 Brahim Ayad
 Ja'Ovvoni Garrison

Declined
 Dennis Kucinich, former U.S. Representative and former Mayor of Cleveland

Endorsements

Polling

Results

General election

Candidates
 Frank G. Jackson, incumbent Mayor of Cleveland
 Zack Reed, Cleveland City Council member

Endorsements

Polling

with Eric Brewer

with Jeff Johnson

Results

References

External links
Official campaign websites
Frank Jackson for Mayor
Zack Reed for Mayor

2010s in Cleveland
Cleveland mayoral
Cleveland
Mayoral elections in Cleveland
Non-partisan elections